Rellik ("Killer" spelled backwards) is a crime drama television series created and written by brothers Harry and Jack Williams that premiered on 11 September 2017. The project was commissioned by the BBC in 2015, with Cinemax joining them later in November 2016. In the United States the series premiered on 13 April 2018.

Synopsis

The series tells the story of the hunt for a serial killer who always attacks his victims with acid. The chief investigating officer, Detective Chief Inspector Gabriel Markham, himself becomes a victim of the perpetrator but survives the attack. The story is shown in reverse, starting with the police shooting the suspected killer and then moving backwards in sections to finish at the beginning of the story. The period of time the story has moved backwards is shown each time on the screen.

Cast and characters

Main
Richard Dormer as DCI Gabriel Markham
Jodi Balfour as DI Elaine Shepard
Paterson Joseph as Dr Isaac Taylor
Lærke Winther as Lisa Markham
Shannon Tarbet as Hannah Markham
Paul Rhys as Patrick Barker
Michael Shaeffer as Steven Mills
Rosalind Eleazar as Christine Levison
Georgina Rich as Beth Mills
Ray Stevenson as DSI Edward Benton

Recurring
Clare Holman as Rebecca Barker
Clive Russell as Henry Parides
Kieran Bew as DI Mike Sutherland
Reece Ritchie as DC Asim Fry
Faye Castelow as DS Jenny Roberts
Joseph Macnab as DC Sam Myers
Mimi Ndiweni as DC Andrea Reed
Michael Wildman as DI Martin Brook
Tanya Reynolds as Sally
Annabel Bates as Jill Parides
Charlotte Dylan as Cassie Hughes
Richard Cunningham as Brian Sweeney
Lucy Chappell as Kerri
Michael Sardine as Dr Jonas Borner

Episodes

Production
Harry Williams and Jack Williams began writing Rellik while they were filming and editing the first series of The Missing. "We didn't want it to be a technical exercise," the pair remarked, "so we had to ask ourselves why you'd tell a story that way. It became clear quite quickly that it was all about motive. That things happen for a reason and those reasons lie in the past. So, what happens when you start at the end and find your way back to the past sounded like an interesting thing to explore."

Reception
Initial reaction after the first episode were mixed: some people struggled to understand the programme's style. Episode one's consolidated viewing figure of 4.96 million fell to 2.82 million for episode two and subsequent episodes failed to register at all in the top 30 programmes for the week on BBC1.
However, after the show's finale, it received acclaim from critics.

References

External links
 
 

2017 British television series debuts
2017 British television series endings
2010s British crime television series
2010s British drama television series
BBC high definition shows
BBC television dramas
2010s British television miniseries
English-language television shows
Television series about fictional serial killers
Cinemax original programming